The 52nd Arizona State Legislature, consisting of the Arizona State Senate and the Arizona House of Representatives, was constituted in Phoenix from January 1, 2015 to December 31, 2016, during the first two years of Doug Ducey's first full term in office. Both the Senate and the House membership remained constant at 30 and 60, respectively. Senate balance was unchanged, leaving the Republicans with a 17-13 majority. Republicans also maintained an unchanged 36–24 majority in the House. One senator switched party affiliation from Democrat to Republican in November 2015, boosting the Senate Republican majority to 18-12 for the second legislative session.

Sessions
The Legislature met for two regular sessions at the State Capitol in Phoenix. The first opened on January 12, 2015, and adjourned on April 3, while the Second Regular Session convened on January 11, 2016 and adjourned sine die on May 7.

There was one Special Session, which was convened on October 28, 2015 and adjourned on October 30.

State Senate

Members

The asterisk (*) denotes members of the previous Legislature who continued in office as members of this Legislature.

House of Representatives

Members 
The asterisk (*) denotes members of the previous Legislature who continued in office as members of this Legislature.

References

Arizona legislative sessions
2015 in Arizona
2016 in Arizona
2015 U.S. legislative sessions
2016 U.S. legislative sessions